Leiotulus is a genus of flowering plants belonging to the family Apiaceae.

Its native range is Southern and Eastern Mediterranean to Iran.

Species:

Leiotulus alexandrinus 
Leiotulus aureus 
Leiotulus dasyanthus 
Leiotulus involucratus 
Leiotulus isfahanicus 
Leiotulus kotschyi 
Leiotulus nydeggeri 
Leiotulus pastinacifolius 
Leiotulus porphyrodiscus 
Leiotulus secacul

References

Apiaceae
Apiaceae genera
Taxa named by Christian Gottfried Ehrenberg